Anne-Marie Bănuță (born 16 November 1991) is a Romanian-French women's football forward who plays for Nantes in the Division 2 Féminine.

Career
She previously played for Toulouse and Saint-Étienne.

She chose to play for the Romanian national team, and made her debut on 31 March 2012 scoring two goals against Kazakhstan.

Personal life
Her brother Alexandru Bănuță is also a football player. Their father George Bănuță who emigrated to France, the same.

Honours

Club
Saint-Étienne
Coupe de France Féminine: runners-up 2012–13

References

1991 births
Living people
Footballers from Toulouse
French women's footballers
Toulouse FC (women) players
AS Saint-Étienne (women) players
Romanian women's footballers
French people of Romanian descent
Romania women's international footballers
Rodez AF (women) players
Division 1 Féminine players
Women's association football midfielders
Women's association football forwards